German submarine U-387 was a Type VIIC U-boat of Nazi Germany's Kriegsmarine during World War II.

She carried out ten patrols. She sank no ships.

She was a member of eleven wolfpacks.

She was sunk by HMS Bamborough Castle in the Barents Sea on 9 December 1944.

Design
German Type VIIC submarines were preceded by the shorter Type VIIB submarines. U-387 had a displacement of  when at the surface and  while submerged. She had two shafts and two  propellers.

U-387 was fitted with five  torpedo tubes (four fitted at the bow and one at the stern), fourteen torpedoes, one  SK C/35 naval gun, 220 rounds, and two twin  C/30 anti-aircraft guns. The boat had a complement of between forty-four and sixty.

Service history
The submarine was laid down on 5 September 1941 at the Howaldtswerke yard at Kiel as yard number 18, launched on 1 October 1942 and commissioned on 24 November under the command of Kapitänleutnant Rudolf Büchler.

She served with the 5th U-boat Flotilla from 24 November 1942 and the 7th flotilla from 1 July 1943. She was reassigned to the 13th flotilla from 1 November until her loss.

First patrol
U-387s first patrol was preceded by short trips from Kiel to Marviken, then to Bergen in June 1943. The boat's patrol proper commenced with her departure from Bergen on 3 July. She followed the Norwegian coast as far as Bodø and then headed due north as far as a point a few miles short of Svalbard. She then sailed south, passing to the west of Bear Island, docking in Narvik on 21 August. At 50 days, it was her longest patrol, but sighting the enemy did not happen.

Second and third patrols
The boat's second and third sorties were both divided into two parts. Her crew got to know the northern Norwegian, Greenland and Barents Seas particularly well.

Fourth, fifth and sixth patrols
The monotony of her fourth, fifth and sixth forays was not relieved by success.

Seventh patrol
By now based in Narvik, the submarine was carrying out her seventh patrol when she was attacked by a Norwegian-crewed Sunderland flying boat of No. 330 Squadron RAF. Enough damage was inflicted to oblige the U-boat to put into Trondheim for repairs.

Eight and ninth patrols
U-387s eighth patrol was uneventful as was her ninth, which took her to the waters around the North Cape.

Tenth patrol and loss
The boat left Narvik for the last time on 24 November 1944. On 9 December, she was sunk in the Barents Sea near Murmansk by depth charges dropped by the British corvette .

Fifty-one men died in the U-boat; there were no survivors.

Wolfpacks
U-387 took part in eleven wolfpacks, namely:
 Monsun (4 – 5 October 1943) 
 Eisenbart (23 October – 5 December 1943) 
 Eisenbart (7 December 1943 – 3 January 1944) 
 Donner & Keil (21 April – 3 May 1944) 
 Trutz (23 – 31 May 1944) 
 Grimm (31 May – 6 June 1944) 
 Feuer (17 September 1944) 
 Zorn (29 September – 1 October 1944) 
 Grimm (1 – 2 October 1944) 
 Panther (17 October – 7 November 1944) 
 Stier (25 November – 9 December 1944)

References

Bibliography

External links

German Type VIIC submarines
U-boats commissioned in 1942
U-boats sunk in 1944
U-boats sunk by British warships
U-boats sunk by depth charges
1942 ships
Ships built in Kiel
Ships lost with all hands
World War II submarines of Germany
World War II shipwrecks in the Arctic Ocean
Maritime incidents in December 1944